Valdas Dopolskas (born 30 April 1992) is a Lithuanian marathon runner. In 2015 he broke his personal record and was selected to represent Lithuania at the 2016 Olympics. He speaks Lithuanian, English, Polish and Russian. In 2018, he competed in the men's half marathon at the 2018 IAAF World Half Marathon Championships held in Valencia, Spain. He finished in 104th place.

References

1992 births
Living people
Lithuanian male marathon runners
Lithuanian male long-distance runners
Athletes (track and field) at the 2016 Summer Olympics
Olympic athletes of Lithuania